Vellore taluk is an administrative division (taluk) in Vellore district of the Indian state of Tamil Nadu. The headquarters of the taluk is the town of Vellore.

Demographics
According to the 2011 census, the taluk of Vellore had a population of 686,422 with 339,464 males and 346,958 females. There were 1,022 women for every 1,000 men. The taluk had a literacy rate of 74.37%. Child population in the age group below 6 years were 35,059 Males and 33,359 Females.

References 

Taluks of Vellore district